Basto (1703 – c. 1723) was a British Thoroughbred racehorse, who was one of the most celebrated racehorses of the early 18th century.  He was described as "remarkably strong... one of the most beautiful horses of his colour that ever appeared in this kingdom".

History

Basto was a brown horse, sired by the Byerley Turk, out of Bay Peg, a daughter of the Leedes Arabian.  His breeder, Sir William Ramsden, sold the horse to the Duke of Devonshire while he was still young.

In his racing career at the home of British racing in Newmarket, he won at least five match races (possibly more, since he raced before records were reliably kept) against some of the leading horses of the time.

At the Duke of Devonshire's stud, he sired several important racemares and broodmares including the dams of Old Crab, Blacklegs and Snip. Other offspring included Brown Betty, Coquette and Soreheels.

Race record

Pedigree

Sire line tree

Basto
Soreheels
Grey Soreheels
Dimple
Little Scar

References

Bibliography

Thoroughbred family 6
Racehorses trained in the Kingdom of Great Britain
1703 racehorse births
1720s racehorse deaths
Individual male horses